Ana María Kamper is a dancer, artist and actress of stage, screen and television in Colombia of Austrian descent.
She is one of Colombia's most respected and recognized performers in the television media in Colombia.

Personal life 
Ana Maria Kamper has dedicated her life to art starting very young with ballet lessons, and studied acting for theater and television.

At twelve, she began classes as a classical ballerina. But an ailment in her left leg kept her from ballet, so she devoted herself to teaching in the school of Carlos Jaramillo.

Later, to learn to express and overcome her natural shyness, she studied theater and dramatic expression to Francisco Rincon. Her first theatrical work was replacing Luisa Fernanda Giraldo. She then participated in The Diary of Anne Frank and in Macondo and The Incredible and Sad Tale of Innocent Eréndira and Her Heartless Grandmother, directed by Agustín Núñez. To improve the performance entered the National School of Drama, where she also taught dance.

Ana Maria is comfortable with comedy, especially with works of Molière, which is why she appeared in The ridiculous prices, Pantoja and the Special and Tartuffe. Roberto Reyes later cast her in Musidramas and then called for comedy but what family. His most recent characters were Clarence Rogers, the American woman's return Boundary, and Ophelia in Wait at the end.

Career 

Studied basic of Mater Dei school and college education which was the first school for girls from Colombia, between 1972 and 1988 study dance, ballet, jazz and contemporary dance. Also during those years until 2005, studied music and music theory, studied theater between 1984 and 2007, between 1995 and 2000 study drama and speech training.

Filmography 
 La reina madre - Teatro - 2014
 Los graduados - (2013)
 Mentiras perfectas (2013) 
 Dónde diablos está Umaña? (Colombian telenovela) 2012 - Lorenza Nieto, "Niña Lore" 
 Amores que matan - Teatro - 2011
 A mano limpia - Colombian telenovela (2011)
 A Corazón Abierto (2010)
 Rosario Tijeras (2010)
 La quiero a morir (2008)
 Montecristo: entre el amor y la traición (2007)
 La Milagrosa - Film (2007)
 En los tacones de Eva (2007)
 El ventilador (2007)
 Colombianos un acto de Fe Film (2004)
 The Vagina Monologues (2002 a 2008)
 Todos quieren con Marilyn (2004)
 Me amaras bajo la lluvia (2004)
 Padres e Hijos (1992)
 Punto de giro (2003)
 La Jaula (2003)
 Entretelones (2003)
 Humo en tus ojos - Film(2002)
 Juan joyita quiere ser caballero(2001)
 Enséñame a vivir teatro (2001)
 A donde va Soledad (2000)
 Brujeres (2000)
 Pobre Pablo (2000)
 Terminal - Film (2000)
 La señorita Julia Teatro (2000)
 Tabú (1999)
 Carolina Barrantes (1998)
 Hombres (1997)
 Sobrevivir (1997)
 Leche (1996)
 Compañía teatro (1996)
 Sueños y espejos (1996)
 Los caballeros las prefieren brutas (1995)
 Otra en mí (1995)
 Oro (1995)
 Las aguas mansas (1994)
 Todos en la cama (1994)
 Señora Isabel (1994)
 Equus (1994)
 Cartas a Harrison (1994)
 Mi única verdad(1993)
 Divertimentos Teatro (1993)
 Shampoo (1993)
 La maldición del paraíso (1993)
 Espérame al final (1992)
 Fronteras del regreso (1992)
 Tartufo (1992)
 Pantaleón y las visitadoras (1991)
 Las preciosas ridículas (1991)
 Entremeses (1990)
 Macondo (1989)
 El diario de Ana Frank (1988)
 La maldición del paraíso
 No morirás
 La cándida Eréndira y su abuela desalmada (1982)
 Poker (2010)

References 
Ana Maria Kamper

21st-century Colombian actresses
Colombian television actresses
Colombian film actresses
Living people
Colombian telenovela actresses
Year of birth missing (living people)
20th-century Colombian actresses